Blokwatch is the name of a Belgian newssite, a virtual archive and documentation centre, and meeting point for research on and about the far right in Flanders. Most of its attention is attributed to the Vlaams Belang (formerly called Vlaams Blok, hence the name "BlokWatch"). Among other things, the site provides the complete version (in Dutch) of the Vlaams Belang party statutes ("Basisbeginselen") and the notorious "70 steps plan".

It is an independent volunteer initiative, founded by Marc Spruyt (aka Blokwatcher), author of a number of works on the Vlaams Blok ("Grove Borstels", "Wat het Vlaams Blok verzwijgt") and who is generally considered the expert on the Far Right in Flanders.

History 
 
Blokwatch started around June 6, 2004 (one week before the elections of June 13, 2004) as a weblog. It soon became one of the ten most visited Skynetblogs in Belgium. (Skynet is a local, Belgian blog service.)

Early October 2004 an appeal was launched for new cooperators. Eventually, a team of 12 people was assembled that - after consolidating the Blokwatch web log with 3 other web logs ("Baron Jéan de Sélys-Longchamps", "antifa" and "vlaamsblok.blogspot") - launched the site as it is now on January 7, 2005.

Protection committee 
The site has a protection committee, consisting of:
 Jan Blommaert (professor African languages and cultures University of Ghent, study group Language, Power and Identity Wetenschappelijke Onderzoeksgemeenschap Vlaanderen)
 Ronald Commers (professor Philosophy and Moral sciences University of Ghent, director Center for Ethics and Value Inquiry)
 Dirk Jacobs (professor Groupe d'études sur l'Ethnicité, le Racisme, les Migrations et l'Exclusion (GERME), Sociological Institute, ULB)
 Liga voor de Mensenrechten (League of Human Rights)
 Rik Pinxten (professor Comparative Sciences University of Ghent, president Humanistisch Verbond)
 Pieter Saey (professor Geography University of Ghent, Study group World-System analysis)
 Sami Zemni (professor study of the third world University of Ghent, president Centre for Islam in Europe)

Awards 
Democracy Award 2005 - Blokwatch ended third, and received this citation form the organisations "vzw Trefpunt" and "Democratie 2000" that presented the award on July 21, 2005 : "Blokwatch is today the most important source of information on the anti-democratic operation of the far right, especially since a number of quality newspapers have given up their research journalism in this domain."
Le Prix Raymond Aron pour la démocratie - Blokwatch received this prize on August 26, 2005 in the Parliament of the French Community of Belgium. It was awarded by the "Centre de Recherche et d’Etudes Politiques" (CREP), a pluralistic and independent foundation because of the receiver's engagement for democracy.

See also 
 Anti-fascist research group Kafka, a comparable research and documentation group on right-wing extremism in the Netherlands

References 
The content of this article comes from the equivalent Dutch-language Wikipedia article (retrieved December 7, 2005).

External links 
The Blokwatch site

Belgian news websites
Communications in Belgium
Islam in Belgium